Lego is an unincorporated community in Raleigh County, West Virginia, United States. It was developed as a mining town by the Fire Creek Smokeless Fuel Company.

References

Unincorporated communities in Raleigh County, West Virginia
Unincorporated communities in West Virginia
Coal towns in West Virginia